Pierre Kaffer (born 7 November 1976 in Bad Neuenahr-Ahrweiler, Rhineland-Palatinate) is a race car driver from Germany, currently living in Switzerland.

Career

In 1990, Kaffer started in Karting, moving in 1994 to Formula Ford, later Formula Opel and then from 1997 to 2001 in the German Formula 3 Championship.

His biggest success was in 2004, winning the 12 Hours of Sebring in an Audi R8.

For 2005 and 2006 he competed for Audi Sport Team Joest in the DTM series.

In 2009 Kaffer piloted a Ferrari F430GT for Risi Competizione in the American Le Mans Series.

For 2012, Kaffer competed in the FIA World Endurance Championship and European Le Mans Series in a Pecom Racing Oreca 03-Nissan.

Racing record

24 Hours of Le Mans results

Complete Porsche Supercup results
(key) (Races in bold indicate pole position) (Races in italics indicate fastest lap)

‡ Not eligible for points for being a guest driver.

Complete European Le Mans Series results
(key) (Races in bold indicate pole position; races in italics indicate fastest lap)

Complete Deutsche Tourenwagen Masters results
(key) (Races in bold indicate pole position) (Races in italics indicate fastest lap)

† — Retired, but was classified as he completed 90% of the winner's race distance.

Complete Porsche Carrera Cup Germany results
(key)

Complete FIA World Endurance Championship results
(key) (Races in bold indicate pole position; races in italics indicate fastest lap)

Complete IMSA SportsCar Championship results
(key) (Races in bold indicate pole position; results in italics indicate fastest lap)

† Kaffer did not complete sufficient laps in order to score full points.

Complete Blancpain GT Series Sprint Cup results
(key) (Races in bold indicate pole position; races in italics indicate fastest lap)

External links

Pierre Kaffer's website
Sports car racing’s Iron Man  - Racer, Gary Watkins, 26 June 2014

1976 births
Living people
People from Bad Neuenahr-Ahrweiler
German racing drivers
Deutsche Tourenwagen Masters drivers
24 Hours of Le Mans drivers
24 Hours of Daytona drivers
American Le Mans Series drivers
European Le Mans Series drivers
EFDA Nations Cup drivers
Racing drivers from Rhineland-Palatinate
Porsche Supercup drivers
FIA World Endurance Championship drivers
Blancpain Endurance Series drivers
International GT Open drivers
ADAC GT Masters drivers
WeatherTech SportsCar Championship drivers
24 Hours of Spa drivers
Asian Le Mans Series drivers
12 Hours of Sebring drivers
24H Series drivers
Audi Sport drivers
AF Corse drivers
Kolles Racing drivers
Phoenix Racing drivers
CRS Racing drivers
Team Joest drivers
Opel Team BSR drivers
German Formula Three Championship drivers
Walter Lechner Racing drivers
ISR Racing drivers
Starworks Motorsport drivers
DragonSpeed drivers
Team Rosberg drivers
Mücke Motorsport drivers
W Racing Team drivers
Nürburgring 24 Hours drivers
Le Mans Cup drivers
Porsche Carrera Cup Germany drivers
German expatriate sportspeople in Switzerland